Eastwood School may refer to:

Eastwood Elementary School (disambiguation), various schools
Eastwood High School (Texas), El Paso, Texas, United States
Eastwood High School, Newton Mearns, East Renfrewshire, Scotland
Eastwood High School (Ohio), Pemberville, Ohio, United States
Eastwood International School Beirut, Lebanon
Eastwood School, now Lantrip Elementary School, Houston, Texas
The Eastwood School, now The Eastwood Academy, Essex, England

See also
Eastwood Academy, Houston, Texas
The Eastwood Academy, Essex, England
Eastwood College, Lebanon
Eastwood Collegiate Institute, Kitchener, Ontario
Eastwood Local School District, Ohio
Eastwood (disambiguation)